Vaagai Sooda Vaa is a 2011 Tamil-language period drama film directed by A. Sarkunam, directing his second film after Kalavani. It stars Vimal and newcomer Ineya, with Bhagyaraj, Ponvannan and Thambi Ramaiah playing supporting roles. The film is a period piece set in the 1960s in a remote village in Tamil Nadu. The film released on 30 September 2011 to generally positive reviews. Subsequently, the film was honored with the National Film Award for Best Feature Film in Tamil for 2012.

Plot 
The story is set in the 1960s. Veluthambi (Vimal) is a graduate aspiring for a government job. His father Annamalai (Bhagyaraj) advises him to work temporarily for an NGO that helps in educating rural children so that he will be given a priority for a government job. Velu, although uninterested, joins the NGO and gets appointed as a teacher in a small dry village which lacks basic facilities. The entire village works for a rich landlord named JP (Ponvannan), who owns a brick factory. Velu tries to convince the villagers to send their kids to learn, but in vain.

Madhiarasi (Ineya) owns a tea shop in the village with her brother (Dhashwanth) and falls in love with Velu. Also, the village kids play pranks on Velu, which irritates him. Velu understands that the villagers are exploited by JP, owing to their illiteracy by not paying them properly. Velu tries to make the villagers understand JP's true colour, but they do not believe him as they see JP as their savior.

Finally, the villagers understand that they are being cheated, and they demand proper payment for the bricks made by them. They also realize the value of education and send their kids to learn under Velu. Now, Velu gets a government job but turns down the offer as he prefers to continue working for the NGO, which gives him satisfaction. In a few days, he gets a letter from the NGO, stating that it is closing down due to financial difficulties. Velu worries as he is jobless and decides to work along with villagers in making bricks. The villagers come for the rescue and want him to continue as a teacher for their kids, and in turn, they agree to pay him. Velu also marries Madhi, and the movie ends with him feeling proud that the villagers understood the value of education.

Cast 

 Vimal as Veluthambi
 Ineya as Madhiarasi
 Bhagyaraj as Annamalai
 Ponvannan as JP
 Dhashwanth as Madhiarasi's Brother
 Thambi Ramaiah as Twonaalettu (2 × 4 = 8)
 Elango Kumaravel as Kuruvikarrar
 Sathish as Lorry Driver
 Soori as Man at theatre shooting M. N. Nambiar 
 Thennavan as Dhamo
 Poovitha as Sivagami
 Hello Kandasamy

Production 
Shortly after the release of Kalavani, which emerged a sleeper hit, Sarkunam had informed that he had "a couple of scripts in mind" and was discussing with his team on which they should work next, while stating that it "most probably" will not be set in a village again. He started working on his next project in late 2010, which he had titled as Vaagai Sooda Vaa, roping in Vimal, who played the lead role in Kalavani, for the lead character again. The film was revealed to be a period piece, set in 1966, with Sarkunam describing it as a "romance drama sprinkled with humour", while also stating it would convey a "much-needed" message. Vaagai Sooda Vaa was Sarkunam's first script and his "dream project", which he had wanted to make his directorial debut with, but he had to drop the idea, since no producer was willing to produce a period film with a newcomer in the lead role. He dismissed reports that the film was based on a Hollywood film and clarified that it was based on a scheme introduced by the Government in the sixties.

Vimal was identified to play a young man named Veluthambi, who had finished his PUC and aspires to become a teacher. The lead female role was that of a "tea tender" of the 1960s, a person working at a tea shop. Initially Amala Paul was signed up for the role, much before the release of her critically acclaimed Mynaa. However, Amala, who following the release became much sought-after, was soon ousted from the project, since she started adjusting her dates as per her wishes and refused to take rehearsals first, which Sarkunam did not agree with. She was replaced by a Malayali model-turned-actress Ineya, who had previously appeared in several Malayalam films and the 2011 Tamil film Yuddham Sei under her original name Shruthi. Ineya had been rejected at first, but was later approved by Sarkunam, when she visited his office during a Chennai trip and showed keen interest in the project and the role. Director-cum-actors K. Bhagyaraj and Thambi Ramaiah were signed to portray the fathers of the lead male and female characters, respectively, while Ponvannan would enact the antagonist's role and Elango Kumaravel would play a pivotal role as a "kuruvikaarar".

Contrary to what Sarkunam had initially planned, Vaagai Sooda Vaa, too, was a story set in a village. Seenu, an assistant Sabu Cyril, took care of the art direction and erected a set of a village of 1 crore worth, near Aruppukottai. The team had further conducted extensive historical research to create an authentic portrayal of the 1960s. Programmes that were aired on Radio Ceylon, which most people during that time were listening to, were imitated, with mimicry artists being roped in to reproduce the voices of the broadcasters of that time.

Release

Reception 
Vaagai Sooda Vaa released to mostly positive reviews from the critics. Sifys reviewer called it a "thought provoking film which is beautiful, complete and laced with social consciousness", further adding that it was a "bittersweet tale of human frailties, a small film with a very big heart and a subtle message". A critic from Times of India gave the film 3.5 out of 5, labelling it a "simple tale, beautifully narrated on screen", while citing that it was a "welcome trip back to the villages and to a time when success wasn't defined by wealth alone". Malathai Rangarajan from The Hindu wrote that the film was not a "run-of-the-mill entertainer, yet it entertains", summarizing it as "poignancy with an ample dose of healthy fun". Anupama Subramanian from Deccan Chronicle gave it 3 out of 5, citing that "though the pace suffers and in many places it gives you a docu-drama feel, Sargunam's intention of making a movie different from the run-of-the mill kind should be lauded". The critic from Behindwoods wrote that the film worked "big time due to the brilliant detailing of Sarkunam and team, art director Seenu, cinematographer Om Prakash and music director Ghibran" and that it "emerges triumphant bringing out the period feel with a simple love story and a noble message", giving it 3 out of 5. Indiaglitz reviewer described the film as "strikingly different" and an "interesting watch", while noting it was "more a docu drama touching up the economic struggles of the oppressed". Chennai Online'''s reviewer wrote that the film was a "must-watch for those looking for a clean movie sans bloodshed, gory violence and obscene dialogues. The script, cinematography, art work and appreciable performances by the lead actors make it a compelling viewing".

 Soundtrack 
The film's score and soundtrack are scored by debutant M. Ghibran, a friend of Sarkunam. Vaagai Sooda Vaa marks the film debut for Ghibran, who had been composing jingles before. The soundtrack, which was released on 1 July 2011, features 6 songs, with lyrics penned by Vairamuthu, Karthik Netha and Ve. Ramasamy. Ghibran had collaborated with the Lisbon International Symphony Orchestra for one of the songs.

 Awards 
National Film Awards
 Best Feature Film in Tamil.

 Tamil Nadu State Film Awards 

 Best Film 2011 
 Best Actor – Vimal 2011
 Best Actress – Ineya 2011
 Best Villain – Ponvannan 2011

Edison Awards
 Best Debut Actress – Ineya

Filmfare Awards South
 Best Female Playback Singer – Chinmayi
 Best Lyricist – Vairamuthu
 Best Actress – Ineya (Nominated)
 Best Music Director – M Ghibran (Nominated)

International Tamil Film Awards
 Best Male Playback – Ranjith for "Poraaney Poraney"

Mirchi Music Awards
 Best Upcoming Music Director – M. Ghibran
 Mannin Kural – Male – Jayamoorthy for "Thanjavuru Maadathi"
 Mannin Kural – Female – Anitha for "Senga Solla Kaara"

Norway Tamil Film Festival Awards
Best Feature Film in Tamil
Best Female Playback Singer in Tamil - Chinmayi

South Indian International Movie Awards
 Best Female Playback Singer - Chinmayi
 Best Music Director – M Ghibran (Nominated)
 Best Cinematographer – Om Prakash (Nominated)

Vijay Awards
 Best Art Director – Seenu
 Best Female Playback Singer – Chinmayi
 Best Lyricist – Vairamuthu
 Best Find of the Year – M Ghibran
 Best Film – Vaagai Sooda Vaa'' (Nominated)
 Best Director – A. Sarkunam (Nominated)
 Best Actress – Iniya (Nominated)
 Best Debut Actress – Iniya (Nominated)
 Best Cinematographer- Om Prakash (Nominated)
 Best Music Director – M Ghibran (Nominated)
 Best Background Score – M Ghibran (Nominated)
 Best Make Up Artistes (Nominated)
 Best Costume Designer (Nominated)

Vijay Music Awards
 Best Female Singer – Chinmayi

Critical reception 
Times of India gave 4/5 for the music and stated "M Ghibran joins the list of debut composers who have impressed with their work in recent times. The music score complements the movie, and marks him out as a musician to watch out for." Karthik Srinivasan from milliblog gave "A 200 for a debutant composer after a long time in Tamil!" and commented that "Vaagai Sooda Vaa’s soundtrack is a brilliant achievement – the music is refined and layered, something that is rarely expected out of a debut! Hats off, Ghibran!" Malathai Rangarajan from The Hindu wrote that "Music is another highlight. M. Gibran's numbers keep ringing in your ears long after you leave the cinema" Rajagopalan Badrinarayanan from musicperk.com wrote "'Vaagai Sooda Vaa' is a wholesome package with wonderful songs. Being his first movie Gibran has done a great job with the musical score. This movie has given him a great scope to prove his potential. The album will surely reshuffle the current chart"

References

External links 
 
 

Films set in the 1960s
2011 films
2010s Tamil-language films
Films scored by Mohamaad Ghibran
Indian historical romance films
2010s historical romance films
Best Tamil Feature Film National Film Award winners
Films directed by A. Sarkunam